Cornukaempferia longipetiolata is a species in the ginger family, Zingiberaceae. It was first described by John Donald Mood and Kai Larsen.

Range
Cornukaempferia longipetiolata is native to Thailand.

References 

Zingiberoideae